Vicente Dias is a settlement in the western part of the island of Fogo, Cape Verde. It is situated 2 km northwest of Luzia Nunes and 5 km east of the island capital São Filipe.

See also
List of villages and settlements in Cape Verde

References

Villages and settlements in Fogo, Cape Verde
São Filipe, Cape Verde